The Ottoman Empire's entry into World War I began when two recently purchased ships of its navy, still crewed by German sailors and commanded by their German admiral, carried out the Black Sea Raid, a surprise attack against Russian ports, on 29 October 1914. Russia replied by declaring war on 1 November 1914 and Russia's allies, Britain and France, then declared war on the Ottoman Empire on 5 November 1914. The reasons for the Ottoman action were not immediately clear. The Ottoman government had declared neutrality in the recently started war, and negotiations with both sides were underway.

This decision would ultimately lead to the deaths of hundreds of thousands of Ottoman citizens, the Armenian genocide, the dissolution of the empire, and the abolition of the Islamic Caliphate.

Background 

At the beginning of the 20th century, the Ottoman Empire had a reputation as the "sick man of Europe", after a century of slow relative decline. The empire was weakened by political instability, military defeat, civil strife and uprisings by national minorities.

The economic resources of the Ottoman Empire were depleted by the cost of the First Balkan War in 1912 and Second Balkan War in 1913. The French, British and Germans had offered financial aid, during which, a pro-German faction influenced by Enver Pasha, the former Ottoman military attaché in Berlin, opposed the pro-British majority in the Ottoman cabinet and tried to secure closer relations with Germany. In December 1913, the Germans sent General Otto Liman von Sanders and a military mission to Constantinople. The geographical position of the Ottoman Empire meant that Russia, France and Britain had a mutual interest in Turkish neutrality, should there be a war in Europe.

In 1908, the Young Turks seized power in Constantinople and installed Sultan Mehmed V as a figurehead in 1909. The new regime implemented a programme of reform to modernise the political and economic system of the empire and to redefine its racial character. The Young Turks restored the Ottoman constitution of 1876 and reconvened the Ottoman parliament, effectively starting the Second Constitutional Era. Young Turk movement members once underground (named committee, group, etc.) established (declared) their parties. Among them, the "Committee of Union and Progress" (CUP) and the "Freedom and Accord Party"—also known as the Liberal Union or Liberal Entente (LU)—were major parties. A general election was held in October and November 1908 and CUP became the majority party.

Germany, an enthusiastic supporter of the new regime, provided investment capital. German diplomats gained influence and German officers assisted in training and re-equipping the army, but Britain remained the predominant power in the region.

During this period the Ottoman Army faced many challenges including the Italo-Turkish War (1911), the Balkan Wars (1912–13), unrest on the periphery (such as in the Yemen Vilayet and the Hauran Druze Rebellion), and continuous political unrest in the empire: the 31 March Incident, and coups in 1912 and 1913. Thus, at the onset of the First World War, the Ottoman Army had already been involved in continuous fighting for the previous three years.

The international political climate at the beginning of the twentieth century was a multipolar one, with no single or two states pre-eminent. Multi-polarity traditionally had afforded the Ottomans the ability to play-off one power against the other, which they did a number of times with consummate skill, according to author Michael Reynolds. Germany had supported Abdul Hamid II's regime and acquired a strong foothold. Initially, the newly formed CUP and LU turned to Britain. The empire hoped to break France and Germany's hold and acquire greater autonomy for the Porte by encouraging Britain to compete against Germany and France.

Hostility toward Germany increased when her ally, Austria-Hungary, annexed Bosnia and Herzegovina in 1908. The pro-CUP Tanin went so far as to suggest that Vienna's motive in carrying out this act was to strike a blow against the constitutional regime and provoke a reaction in order to bring about its fall. Two prominent CUP members, Ahmed Riza and Dr. Nazim, were sent to London to discuss the possibility of cooperation with  Sir Edward Grey (British Foreign Secretary) and Sir Charles Hardinge (a senior Foreign Office official). At the start of 1914, in the aftermath of the Balkan Wars (1912–13), CUP became convinced that only an alliance with Britain and the Entente could guarantee the survival of what remained of the Empire. Britain's response, Sir Louis Mallet, who became Britain's Ambassador to the Porte in 1914, noted that  The CUP could not possibly accept such proposals. They felt betrayed by what they considered was the European Powers' bias against the Ottomans during the Balkan Wars, and therefore they had no faith in Great Power declarations regarding the Empire's independence and integrity on the abstract; the termination of European financial control and administrative supervision was one of the principal aims of CUP's movement. Sir Louis Mallet, Ambassador, seemed totally oblivious to that.

Russian position
Russia's expanding economy was quickly becoming uncomfortably dependent on the Ottoman Straits for exports. Indeed, a quarter of Russian products passed through Straits.  Control of the Straits and of Constantinople was a high priority for Russian diplomatic and military planning. During the public disorders of the Young Turk Revolution and 31 March Incident, Russia considered landing troops in Constantinople. In May 1913 the German military mission assigned Otto Liman von Sanders to help train and reorganise the Ottoman army. This was intolerable for St. Petersburg, and Russia developed a plan for invading and occupying the Black Sea port of Trabzon or the Eastern Anatolian town of Bayezid in retaliation. Russia could not at the time find a military solution for a full invasion, which this small occupation might become. 

If there was to be no solution through naval occupation of Constantinople, the next option was to improve the Russian Caucasian Army. In supporting their army, Russia established local links to regional groups within the Empire. They resolved that the army, navy, ministries of finance, trade, and industry would work together to solve the transport problem, achieve naval supremacy, and increase the number of men and artillery pieces assigned to amphibious operations, which this Army would need to achieve during mobilisation. They decided also to expand Russia's Caucasian rail network toward the Ottoman Empire. The Russian drums of war set in 1913. At the time Russia was demanding the implementation of an Armenian reform package.

German position
More than anyone else, Germany had been paying favourable attention to the Ottoman Empire in recent decades. There was collaboration in terms of finance, trade, railroads and military advice. German general Liman von Sanders in 1913 became the latest in a series of German generals working to modernise the Ottoman army. When the war began he was given command of the defence of Gallipoli and defeated the Allies.

Germany had harboured imperial ambitions since 1890, which had not borne fruit, and by 1909, it became clear that Germans would not prevail in the Anglo-German naval arms race. Even with technological superiority, Germany's energy infrastructure would be unable to support battleships in distant waters. Germany was weak relative to the other European colonial powers, and sought a strategic alliance with the Ottoman Empire. The Baghdad Railway would have advanced Germany's imperial ambitions, including the settlement of Germans in Anatolia, and given the Germans greater flexibility in transporting their troops to the Persian Gulf and on to British Raj. As soon as the railway was proposed, it became a point of tension between Germany and the UK, since the latter considered southern Persia their sphere of influence, where German power shouldn't have been projected.

However, in June 1914 Berlin agreed not to construct the line south of Baghdad, and to recognise Britain's preponderant interest in the region. The issue was resolved to the satisfaction of both sides and did not play a role in causing the war.

Alliances 
During the July Crisis over the murder of Archduke Ferdinand in 1914, German diplomats offered Turkey an anti-Russian alliance and territorial gains in Caucasia, north-west Iran and Trans-Caspia. The pro-British faction in the cabinet was isolated because the British ambassador had taken leave until 18 August. As the crisis deepened in Europe, Ottoman policy was to obtain a guarantee of territorial integrity and potential advantages, unaware that the British might enter a European war. On 30 July 1914, two days after the outbreak of the war in Europe, the Ottoman leaders agreed to form a secret Ottoman-German Alliance against Russia, although it did not require them to undertake military action.

On 22 July Enver Pasha, the Ottoman Minister of War, had proposed an Ottoman–German alliance to Baron Hans Freiherr von Wangenheim, the German ambassador in Constantinople. Germany turned down the proposal, considering that Turkey had nothing of value to offer. The grand vezir Said Halim Pasha had made similar propositions to the Austro-Hungarian ambassador. Enver had been military attaché in Berlin from 1909–11, but his relations with the German military mission (mainly personal relation to Otto Liman von Sanders) were not good; he put his faith in his soldiers and army, and deeply resented German military intervention. Neither diplomat received the proposals with acceptance. Cemal Pasha, was sent to Paris in July 1914 for this purpose. He returned to Constantinople with French military decorations but no alliance. Initially, the Ottoman government, especially Minister of State Talaat Pasha, had advocated siding with the British. But Britain said no.

On 28 July 1914 Winston Churchill asked for the requisition of two modern warships being built by British shipyards for the Ottoman navy. Despite questions about the legality of such a seizure, the request was granted at a Cabinet meeting on 31 July, together with an offer to Turkey to pay for the ships. On 2 August, the British requisitioned them, thereby alienating pro-British elements in Constantinople. Enver Pasha, knowing Turkey was about to lose them, had offered to sell the ships to Germany in a renewed attempt at obtaining a treaty of alliance. After Enver's 22 July approach to Germany had been rejected, Kaiser Wilhelm II ordered that it be reconsidered. Renewed negotiations started on 28 July, involving Enver, Talaat, and Said Halim Pasha. In the resulting secret defensive treaty, signed on 1 August, Germany undertook to defend Ottoman territory if it was threatened, and Turkey would join with Germany if German treaty obligations with Austria forced it into war, but would not actually fight on Germany's side unless Bulgaria also did.

The British Pursuit of Goeben and Breslau failed when the Ottoman government opened the Dardanelles to allow them passage to Constantinople, despite being required under international law, as a neutral party, to block military shipping.

On 2 August 1914 the Ottoman Empire ordered general mobilisation, announcing that it would remain neutral. The Ottoman authorities expected mobilisation to be complete within four weeks. Said Halim wanted to have some time to see the development of events, before any more engagements with Germany. He wanted to see the outcome (conclusion) negotiations with Romania, Bulgaria, and Greece. Said Halim took two decisions. First, he directed that the German ambassador not interfere with military affairs, or the German commander, General Liman von Sanders, with politics. Second, he directed that negotiations be reopened with the French and Russian ambassadors. On 9 August, Enver Pasha assigned Liman von Sanders to First Army. Russians interpreted this assignment as improvement of Strait defences. In fact, Liman von Sanders was cut from high level decision cycle by being in the First Army. In the middle of August, Liman von Sanders officially requested to be released and return to Germany. He was completely surprised when his staff relayed the information regarding Battle of Odessa.

On 3 August, the Ottoman government officially declared neutrality.

On 5 August, Enver informed the Russians that he was willing to reduce the number of troops along the Russian frontier and strengthen the garrison in eastern Thrace, to prevent Bulgaria or Greece from giving thought to joining the Central Powers. On 9 August, Said informed the Germans that Romania had approached Constantinople and Athens about forming a trilateral (Ottoman–Greek–Romanian) neutrality pact.

On 6 August 1914, at 0100 hours, Said Halim summoned the German ambassador to his office to inform him that the Cabinet had decided unanimously to open the Straits to the German battlecruiser Goeben and light cruiser Breslau, which were being pursued by ships of the Royal Navy, and to any Austro-Hungarian vessels accompanying them. Said then presented Wangenheim with six proposals—not conditions—which the ambassador immediately accepted and which were signed later that day:
 Support in abolishing the foreign capitulations.
 Support in negotiating agreements with Romania and Bulgaria.
 If any Ottoman territories were occupied by enemies of Germany during the course of the war, Germany would not make peace until these were evacuated.
 If Greece should enter the war and be defeated by the Ottoman Empire, the Aegean islands would be returned to the Ottomans.
 An adjustment to the Ottoman border in the Caucasus to bring it up to Muslim-inhabited Russian Azerbaijan.
 A war indemnity.

The German government later gave its approval to these proposals, since it appeared they would only come into play in the event that Germany was in a position to dictate terms at the peace conference.

Wangenheim, on behalf of the German government, secretly purchased Ikdam, the empire's largest newspaper, which under the new ownership began to loudly abuse Britain, France and Russia as Islam's greatest enemies while reminding its readers that the German emperor was the self-proclaimed "protector" of Islam. Increasing large numbers of Germans, both civilians and soldiers began to arrive in Constantinople, who, as the American ambassador Henry Morgenthau, Sr. reported, filled all the cafes and marched through the streets "in the small hours of the morning, howling and singing German patriotic songs" while German officers were "rushing through the streets every day in huge automobiles".

On 9 August 1914, following the Said Halim Pasha's 2 August decision, Enver was communicating with the Russian Ambassador Giers. These talks reached to a point that Enver proposed an Ottoman-Russian Alliance at this day. Historians developed two positions on Enver's proposal. One group believes proposal was a ruse to hide German alliance. Other group believes Enver was acting along the decision of Said Halim and they were sincerely trying to find a viable solution to keep the Empire out of war at this junction. It is clear that there was no member of Ottoman leadership committed to war at this point, they were trying to maximise their options.

On 19 August 1914, an Ottoman–Bulgarian alliance was signed in Sofia during the opening month of the First World War, although at the time both the signatories were neutral. The Minister of the Interior, Talaat Pasha, and President Halil Bey of the Chamber of Deputies signed the treaty on behalf of the Empire and Prime Minister Vasil Radoslavov on behalf of the Kingdom of Bulgaria. The Ottoman Empire and Bulgaria showed sympathy to one another because they suffered as a result of the territories lost with the conclusion of the Balkan Wars (1912–13). They also held bitter relations with Greece. It was natural and beneficial for them to work for the development of policies that enabled them to gain better positions within the region. The Ottoman–Bulgarian alliance may have been a prerequisite for Bulgaria's joining the Central Powers after Turkey entered the war.

On 9 September 1914, the Porte unilaterally abrogated the capitulations granted to foreign powers. The British, French, Russian, Italian, Austro-Hungarian and German ambassadors signed a joint note of protest, but privately the Austro-Hungarian and German ambassadors informed the Grand Vizier that they would not press the issue. On 1 October, the Ottoman government raised its customs duties, previously controlled by the Ottoman Public Debt Administration, and closed all foreign post offices.

On 28 September, the Ottoman government in defiance of the 1841 treaty regulating the use of the Turkish straits linking the Black Sea to the Mediterranean, closed the Turkish straits to international shipping, causing an immense blow to the Russian economy. The Straits were vital for Russian commerce and for communications between the Western Allies and Moscow. 

On 2 October, the British cabinet decided to drop its century-long support for the Ottoman Empire against Russian threats. The decision was that the Russian alliance was more important. The key decision was to keep Russia out of Prague, Vienna, Budapest, Belgrade, Bucharest, and Sofia by giving it Constantinople after the Ottomans were defeated. Russia had always wanted control of Constantinople and the Straits, primarily so it could have free access to the Mediterranean Sea and it agreed to these terms in November.

Entry

Two ships and one admiral 

Ahmet Cemal Pasha was the navy minister and the commander-in-chief of the Ottoman fleet, and had close contact with British through the British Military Mission to help the Empire to improve the Ottoman Navy. The head of the British mission was Admiral Arthur Limpus since April 1912. Admiral Wilhelm Anton Souchon commanded the Mediterranean squadron of the Kaiserliche Marine (German "Imperial Navy"), consisting of the battlecruiser  and the light cruiser . At the outbreak of the war, elements of the British Mediterranean Fleet pursued the German ships. They evaded the British fleet and arrived at Messina in neutral Italy on 4 August 1914. The Italian authorities insisted that the Germans depart within 24 hours, as required by international law. Admiral Souchon learned that Austria-Hungary would provide no naval aid in the Mediterranean and that the Ottoman Empire was still neutral and therefore he should no longer make for Constantinople. Souchon chose to head for Constantinople anyway.

On 6 August 1914, at 0100 hours, Grand Vizier Said Halim Pasha, summoned the German ambassador to his office to inform him that the Cabinet had decided unanimously to open the Straits to Goeben and Breslau, and to any Austrian vessels accompanying them.

On 9 August, the Grand Vizier requested that the Goeben be transferred to Turkish control "by means of a fictitious sale"; the government in Berlin refused. On the afternoon of 10 August, before any agreement had been reached, the German ships reached the entry of the Dardanelles, and Enver authorised their admittance into the Straits. The Vizier objected that the presence of the ships was premature and could trigger an Entente declaration of war before the necessary agreement with Bulgaria had been reached. He renewed his request for a fictitious sale.

On 11 August 1914, Souchon's ships arrived at Constantinople, having escaped the British. Winston Churchill stated about the escape of these ships:

On 16 August, Cemal Pasha presided over the formal commissioning of the Goeben and Breslau, renamed Yavuz Sultan Selim and Midilli, respectively, and their officers and crews into the Ottoman Navy. The sailors put on fezzes. In light of the British seizure of the Ottoman dreadnoughts, the "purchase" of the German ships was a propaganda coup for the Ottomans at home. Souchon's real title at this moment is unknown. As a German commander of a fleet in a foreign country, Souchon was under the aegis of Ambassador Wangenheim. Germany had a military mission under General Otto Liman von Sanders accredited to Turkey on 27 October 1913. Souchon was not part of the military mission and had little to do with Liman von Sanders. At this point, Said Halim feared that neither Souchon nor his ships were under Ottoman Control.

In September 1914, the British naval mission to the Ottomans since 1912 was recalled, due to increasing concern that Turkey would enter World War I; Rear Admiral Wilhelm Souchon of the Imperial German Navy took command of the Ottoman navy. Acting without orders from the Ottoman government, on 27 September, the German commander of the Dardanelles fortifications ordered the passage closed, adding to the impression that the Ottomans were pro-German. The German naval presence and the success of the German armies in Europe, gave the pro-German faction in the Ottoman government sufficient influence over the pro-British faction to declare war on Russia.

On 14 September, Enver directed Souchon to take his ships into the Black Sea and to fire upon any Russian vessel they encountered. This was problematic in many ways. This directive, which went over the head of Cemal Pasha, the Navy Minister, was presumably issued by Enver as acting commander-in-chief, although Souchon's place in the chain of command was unclear. Said Halim forced a cabinet vote on the issue of Enver's directive and it was countermanded. At the same time, Souchon wanted to "conduct training cruises". Souchon complained to Wangenheim, who authorised him to approach the Ottoman government directly. Talks between the German admiral and Said Halim were held on 18 September. Said Halim, who was also assured by Wangenheim, was unhappy about this request. Said Halim feared that neither Souchon nor and his ships were under Ottoman control. The British naval mission was vacated by Admiral Limpus on 15 September; it was proposed that Souchon should take over the departing admiral's role. In early September, a German naval mission, comprising about 700 sailors and coastal defence specialists under Admiral Guido von Usedom, arrived to bolster the defences of the Straits. As per the naval mission headed by Guido von Usedom, Souchon was to receive a one-year commission in the Ottoman Navy, which would place him directly under the orders of Cemal Pasha. Also, Germans were forbidden to exercise in the Black Sea.

On 24 September 1914, Admiral Souchon was commissioned in the Ottoman Navy with the rank of Vice Admiral. As Vice Admiral, Souchon had direct command of instruments of war. Liman von Sanders never reached that level of independence. Souchon's allegiance to the Ottoman Empire was questionable, but through him Germany was able to use the Ottoman war machine independently.

Said Halim brought Souchon and his ships "somewhat" under Ottoman control. There was an ineffective command relationship between the Empire and Souchon. Navy Minister Ahmet Cemal Pasha, appropriately ignored these events in his memoir. Cemal Pasha also paused his memories between 12–30 October.

Casus belli 

In October, Cemal Pasha instructed senior officials that Souchon was entitled to issue orders. Cemal Pasha did not write why he gave this order in his memoir. Souchon at his commission to Ottoman Navy agreed on not to exercise in the Black Sea. In October, Souchon took his heavily flagged and bedecked ships out to the Black Sea.

On 25 October, Enver instructed Souchon to manoeuvre in the Black Sea and attack the Russian fleet "if a suitable opportunity presented itself" This was not passed through normal command-chain, the Ministry of Navy ignoring it. The Ottoman cabinet, including Sait Halim, was not informed.

On 26 October, the Ottoman Navy received orders for the supplying the ships stationed at the Hydarpasha. Ships were declared leaving for a reconnaissance exercise. There was also a sealed order from Souchon.

On 28 October, the Ottoman fleet reorganised in four combat wings. Each one went to separate locations along the Russian coast.

On 29 October (1. wing), Souchon was on his preferred warship, the Goeben. Several destroyers accompanied him. He opened fire on shore batteries on Sevastapol, at 6h 30 (2. wing). The  reached the Black Sea port of Theodosia exactly 6h 30. He informed the local authorities that hostilities began in two hours. He shelled the port from 9 h until 22 h. Then he moved to Yalta and sank several small Russian vessels. At 10h 50 he was at Novorossisysk, informed the locals, fired on shore batteries and laid sixty mines. Seven ships in the port damaged and one sunk (3. wing). Two destroyers engaged the Battle of Odessa (1914) at 6:30 am. They sank two gun-boats and damaged granaries.

On 29 October, the Allies presented a note to Grand Vizier Said Halim Pasha indicating that they had made an agreement with Egypt, and that any hostility towards Egypt would be treated as a declaration of war.

On 29 October, the whole Ottoman fleet returned to Constantinople. Enver wrote a congratulatory letter at 17h 50.

Declaration 

The Ottomans refused an Allied demand that they expel German naval and military missions. The Ottoman Navy destroyed a Russian gunboat on 29 October 6:30 A.M. at Battle of Odessa. On 31 October 1914, Turkey formally entered the war on the side of the Central Powers. Russia declared war on 1 November 1914. The first conflict with Russia was the Bergmann Offensive of Caucasus Campaign on 2 November 1914.

On 3 November, the British ambassador left Constantinople and a British naval squadron off the Dardanelles bombarded the outer defensive forts at Kum Kale on the northern Asian coast and Seddülbahir on the southern tip of the Gallipoli Peninsula. A British shell hit a magazine in one of the forts, knocked the guns off their mounts and killed 

On 2 November the Grand Vizier expressed regret to the Allies for the operations of the Navy. The Russian Minister of Foreign Affairs, Sergey Sazonov, declared that it was too late and that Russia considered this raid an act of war. The Ottoman Cabinet explained in vain that hostilities were begun without its sanction by German officers serving in the Navy.

On 5 November, before the Ottoman Government responded, the United Kingdom and France also declared war on the Ottomans. The Ottomans declared a jihad later that month, beginning the Caucasus Campaign with an offensive against the Russians, to regain former Ottoman provinces. The Mesopotamian Campaign began with a British landing at Basra.

On 11 November 1914 Sultan Mehmed V declared war on Britain, France and Russia. On 13 November 1914 there was a ceremony in which justification of the war was presented to the Sultan Mehmed V. On 14 November came the official declaration of war by the CUP (party of majority at the chamber). The Chamber's declaration (CUP's) could be stated as "declaration of existence of the war". The entire affair was completed in three days. The Ottomans prepared an offensive against Egypt in early 1915, aiming to occupy the Suez Canal and cut the Mediterranean route to India and the Far East. The war began in August 1914 in Europe, and the Ottoman Empire had joined the war on the side of Germany and Austria within three months.

Reactions 
The Battle of Odessa instigated a crisis environment within the Ottoman leadership. Sait Halim and Mehmet Cavit Bey presented strong protests to Enver. The attack was weak and in dispersed naval raids, so it could only be a political provocation, rather than as a serious naval operation. Talat told Wangenheim that the entire cabinet excluding Enver opposed to the naval action.

Over the next two days everything was in chaos. Sait Halim to Sultan and several others to Sait Haim offered their resignations. Mehmet Cavit Bey, the Finance Minister, was one of four ministers to resign, declaring,  Casualties at Gallipoli validated his comment. Although the engagement is considered a "victory" for the Ottomans, they would suffer the staggering loss of up to a quarter of a million soldiers out of an army of 315,500.

This chaos finally showed signs to resolve itself when Enver explained to Talat his reasons for a pro-interventionist stance. However the biggest calming effect came from Russia. Russia declared war on 1 November, short of two days from 29 October. Sait Halim found himself talking to Russia, Britain, and France, in this turn.

Military preparedness 

A new military conscription law had been prepared after the Young Turk Revolution by the Ministry of War in October 1908 (see Conscription in the Ottoman Empire). According to the draft law, all subjects between the ages of 20 and 45 were to fulfill mandatory military service.  This draft law allowed for more than 1 million soldiers to be mobilized by the state in attempt to be better prepared for the war. According to A History of the Modern Middle East (2018) by William L. Cleveland, the declining empire had various unlikely successes during the war. He claimed that "its ability to endure four years of total warfare testified to the tenacity with which its civilian and military populations defended the Ottoman order."

On 13 November 1914 at a ceremony in the Sultan Mehmed V's presence and with the relics of the Prophet, 'holy war' was proclaimed. Five juridical opinions legitimised the call, for the first time called for all Muslims—particularly those in territories ruled by the colonial powers of Britain, France and Russia—to rise against the infidel. There was some enthusiasm for this appeal to the Muslim community at large among Arab clerics, but the Sharif of Mecca's support was critical, and Sharif Husayn, refused to associate himself by stating that it may provoke a blockade, and possibly bombardment, of the ports of the Hijaz by the British (which controlled the Red Sea and Egypt). The reaction from the wider Islamic world was muted. In Egypt and India, for instance, juridical opinions asserted that it was obligatory to obey the British.

The main burden of providing combat manpower fell on the Turkish peasantry of Anatolia, which accounted for some 40 per cent of total Ottoman population at the outset of the war.

Analysis 
There were a number of factors that conspired to influence the Ottoman government, and encourage them into entering the war. According to Kemal Karpat:
 Ottoman entry into the war was not the consequence of careful preparation and long debate in the parliament (which was recessed) and press. It was the result of a hasty decision by a handful of elitist leaders who disregarded democratic procedures, lacked long-range political vision, and fell easy victim to German machinations and their own utopian expectations of recovering the lost territories in the Balkans. The Ottoman entry into war prolonged it for two years and allowed the Bolshevik revolution to incubate and then explode in 1917, which in turn profoundly impacted the course of world history in the 20th century.

Russian threat 
Russia was the pivotal factor politically. When Britain was drawn into the Triple Entente and began to cultivate relations with Russia, the Porte became distrustful. The Porte had gradually drifted, with opposition from the parliament, into close political relations with Germany. The relationship between the United Kingdom and France had encouraged Italy to seize Tripoli. Russian designs on the Straits (for open access to the Mediterranean and Atlantic Ocean from its Black Sea ports) were well known. These conditions put the United Kingdom, France, and Russia against Germany. Even the pro-Entente Cemal Pasha recognised that the Empire had no choice but to conclude an agreement with Germany and the Central Powers to avoid being left isolated in another moment of crisis.

The Porte's policy would naturally be inclined toward dependence on Berlin. The Ottoman-German Alliance promised to isolate Russia. In exchange for money and future control over Russian territory, the Ottoman Government abandoned a neutral position and sided with Germany.

Empire's Christians perceived as fifth column 
Violence associated with the Greek genocide had already begun prior to the assassination of Archduke Franz Ferdinand.  A few months later the Special Organization enlarged the scope of its anti-Christian activities into what would become the Armenian genocide.

Financial position 
The total pre-war debt of the Empire was $716,000,000. Of this, France held 60 per cent of the total, Germany held 20 per cent, and the United Kingdom comprised 15 per cent. Siding with Germany, with the minimum debt holder (20 per cent compared to 75 per cent), put the Empire in the position to settle its debts or even receive a war indemnity. Indeed, on the day of the signing of the alliance with Germany, the government announced the end of foreign debt repayments. The German ambassador proposed a joint protest with the empire's other creditor—states, on the grounds that international regulations could not be unilaterally abrogated, but no agreement could be reached on the text of the protest note.

Inevitability of war
The undisputed point, in all these arguments is that a small group of politicians tied the state to the Central Powers. The more important question was what choices they had. The empire tried to walk a neutral path for as long as they could.

Risk all 
The Empire was portrayed as risking everything to resolve regional issues. At this point of time, from the record, the Empire did not have finely tuned war aims. Neither Germany nor any of the other Central Powers had to make significant concessions to formulate the Ottoman alliance which created a strategic problem for the Entente. Some historians have argued that the Empire went unwillingly into the war, despite the actions of Enver Pasha. His celebration of the Battle of Odessa (1914) separated him from other cabinet members. It is proposed that Enver Pasha knew the consequences of Odessa beforehand. His defence made him appear complicit even if he wasn't.

German maneuvering 
In three months time, the Empire shifted from a neutral position to full-fledged belligerence.

Ambassador Wangenheim and Vice Admiral Souchon are credited for the change in the Empire's position. While Wangenheim was assigned to Constantinople, Souchon's presence was accidental and for his service he was awarded the Pour le Mérite, Germany's highest military order, on 29 October 1916.

The Ottoman Navy lacked heavy power. The British Naval Mission was established as an assistance branch. Admiral Arthur Limpus arrived in April 1912. The British Naval Mission was to turn into a full-blown mission with the arrival of two warships built in British yards as planned. With the questionable legality of the British requisitioning of two modern battleships and the public outrage that followed, that action opened the position to Admiral Souchon. Germany manoeuvred and filled the gap. Winston Churchill, First Lord of the Admiralty claimed the Curse descended irrevocably upon the Ottoman Empire and the East.

See also
 Causes of World War I
 Historiography of the causes of World War I
 Austro-Hungarian entry into World War I
 British entry into World War I
 French entry into World War I
 Italian entry into World War I
 Diplomatic history of World War I
 International relations of the Great Powers (1814–1919)
 Central Powers
 Home front during World War I covering all major countries

Notes

References

External links
Yanıkdağ, Yücel: Ottoman Empire/Middle East, in: 1914-1918-online. International Encyclopedia of the First World War.
Yasamee, Feroze: War Aims and War Aims Discussions (Ottoman Empire), in: 1914-1918-online. International Encyclopedia of the First World War.
Moreau, Odile: Pre-war Military Planning (Ottoman Empire), in: 1914-1918-online. International Encyclopedia of the First World War.
 The Ottomans: Europe's Muslim Emperors

Bibliography

Akın, Yiğit (2018). When the War Came Home: The Ottomans' Great War and the Devastation of an Empire. Stanford University Press.

 Aksakal, Mustafa. "‘Holy War Made in Germany’? Ottoman Origins of the 1914 Jihad." War in History 18.2 (2011): 184-199.
 Balki, Ali et al. "War Decision and Neoclassical Realism: The Entry of the Ottoman Empire into the First World War" War in History (2018) pp 1-28 https://doi.org/10.1177/0968344518789707 online
 Beckett, F.W. "Turkey's Momentous Moment" History Today (June 2013) 63#6 pp 47-53

 Bozarslan, Hamit. "The Ottoman Empire." in John Horne. ed. A Companion to World War I (2010): 494-507.
 Cornelissen, Christoph, and Arndt Weinrich, eds. Writing the Great War - The Historiography of World War I from 1918 to the Present (2020) free download; full coverage for major countries. 
 
 
 
 
 Gingeras, Ryan. Fall of the Sultanate: The Great War and the End of the Ottoman Empire, 1908-1922 (Oxford UP, 2016).
 
 
 
 Karpat, Kemal H. "The entry of the ottoman empire into world war I." Belleten 68.253 (2004): 1-40. online
 Kayalı, Hasan. "The Ottoman Experience of World War I: Historiographical Problems and Trends," Journal of Modern History (2017) 89#4: 875-907. https://doi.org/10.1086/694391.
 
 Macfie, A. L. The End of the Ottoman Empire, 1908-1923 (1998). 

 Öncü, Edip. "The beginnings of Ottoman-German partnership: diplomatic and military relations between Germany and the Ottoman Empire before the First World War" (MA thesis Bilkent University, 2003); online, reviews the Turkish language scholarship.
 Penix, Matthew David. "The Ottoman Empire in the first world war: A rational disaster" ( MA thesis Eastern Michigan U. 2013)).  online, bibliography pp 58–66
 
 Smith, C. Jay. "Great Britain and the 1914-1915 Straits Agreement with Russia: The British Promise of November 1914." American Historical Review 70.4 (1965): 1015-1034. online
 
 Trumpener, Ulrich. (2003). "The Ottoman Empire" in Richard F. Hamilton and Holger H. Herweg, eds. The Origins of World War I pp 337-55
 
 Trumpener, Ulrich. "Liman von Sanders and the German-Ottoman alliance." Journal of Contemporary History 1.4 (1966): 179-192  online.
 Trumpener, Ulrich. Germany and the Ottoman Empire, 1914-1918 (1968)
 Weber, Frank G. Eagles on the crescent: Germany, Austria, and the diplomacy of the Turkish alliance, 1914-1918 (Cornell UP, 1970).

1914 in the Ottoman Empire
1914 in international relations
Politics of the Ottoman Empire
Ottoman Empire in World War I
Entry into World War I by country